Ed Video Media Arts Centre (aka Ed Video ) is an artist-run centre with a focus on video art, but also serving all forms of media art.

Ed Video is a hub for video, film and media artists working at a range of experience and financial levels. The centre supports these artists with affordable access to production equipment, training, social events, and a year-long gallery program. It is Guelph's only artist-run centre and one of these oldest organizations of its kind within Canada.

Members & Contributors 
Many of Canada's most notable video and media artists have accessed the support of Ed Video, taught workshops at the centre, or exhibited through the organization's exhibition program. Over the years the centre's exhibition space has acted as an alternative venue for many up and coming Canadian music acts. Contributors, exhibitors and members (past and present) have included Canadian and international artists such as:
Sara Angelucci
Chad Archibald
Janet Cardiff
Philip Carrer 
Nick DenBoer
Kenneth Doren
Nora Hutchinson
Eduardo Kac
Stan Krzyzanowski
John Kilduff
Riaz Mehmood
Jenn E. Norton
Aubrey Reeves
Kelly Richardson
Tasman Richardson
Jim Riley
Erin MacIndoe Sproule
Jeff Winch
Lisa Conway

External links

References 
 "Ed Video bounces back after theft" News Article (Guelph Mercury/ Rob O'Flanagan/ March 14, 2011)
 "Ed Video Awaits Justice" News Article (Guelph Mercury/ November 25, 2010)
 "Ed Video Wants Your Home Movies" News Article (Guelph Mercury/Rob O'Flanagan/October 6, 2010)
 "Indie Art Screening" News Article (Echo Weekly/July 17, 2003)
 "Ed Video's Perimeter 2 Festival" News Article (Echo Weekly/ Declan Kelly/ September 25, 2003)
 "Ed Video's Back in Action" News Article (Guelph Tribune/January 11, 2011)
 "Ed Video Looks to Artists for 'identity' problem" News Article (guelph Tribune/November 13, 2009)

Buildings and structures in Guelph
Arts centres in Canada
Digital media organizations
Tourist attractions in Guelph